Linda Andre is an American psychiatric survivor activist and writer, living in New York City, who is the director of the Committee for Truth in Psychiatry (CTIP), an organization founded by Marilyn Rice in 1984 to encourage the U.S. Food and Drug Administration (FDA) to regulate electroconvulsive therapy (ECT) machines.

Anti-ECT activism
Since receiving ECT in the early 1980s at age 25, Andre has been writing and doing research to help other ECT survivors cope with their cognitive and memory losses, and inform the general public about the risks of ECT. Linda has been interviewed by 20/20, The Atlantic, the New York Times and the Washington Post.

Interviewed by the Los Angeles Times in 2003, Andre commented on a British study that found that when patients helped to design or conduct ECT surveys, only one third of the respondents claimed to find ECT helpful, but when doctors designed and conducted the surveys, three-fourths claimed to find ECT beneficial. "This is what happens when you ask patients what they think," said Andre, "...you get a completely different story from the one psychiatrists are telling." She and her friends have formed  the Committee for Truth in Psychiatry which has now  over 500 former electric shock patients.

In 2009, her book, Doctors of Deception: What they don't want you to know about shock treatment, was published. Reviewing this work, James Wood, of the University of Edinburgh wrote in the journal the Social History of Medicine, "[O]ver the course of its 17 often meticulously researched chapters, Andre provides a useful contrast to the claims made in Edward Shorter and David Healy's recent paean to ECT and the men who were instrumental in its development (Edward Shorter and David Healy, Shock Therapy, 2007), and offers a potentially devastating critique of both ECT and the modern American psychiatric profession.

Published works

See also

 Clifford Whittingham Beers
 Electroconvulsive therapy
 Elizabeth Packard
 Icarus Project
 Involuntary commitment
 Involuntary treatment
 Judi Chamberlin
 Kate Millett
 Leonard Roy Frank
 List of psychiatric consumer/survivor/ex-patient related topics
 Lyn Duff
 Mad Pride
 MindFreedom International
 National Empowerment Center
 Psychiatric survivors movement
 Ted Chabasinski
 World Network of Users and Survivors of Psychiatry

References

External links
 "Electroshock Deception: Linda Andre", Madness Radio, 12 May 2009
 Review of Doctors of deception by Peter Lehmann in Advocacy Update – The latest in activism and community news from ENUSP,  no. 1 (2010), no. 1, pp. 19-20

Year of birth missing (living people)
Living people
American human rights activists
Women human rights activists
Activists from New York City
Writers from New York City
Psychiatric survivor activists